Dharhara railway station is a railway station on Sahibganj loop line under the Malda railway division of Eastern Railway zone. It is situated beside Jamalpur-Kajra Road at Dharhara in Munger district in the Indian state of Bihar.

References

Railway stations in Munger district
Malda railway division